Greatest Hits is the first compilation album released by Luke.

Track listing
"It's Your Birthday" – 3:42
"Dr. Dre is a Bitch Ass" [Cowards in Compton Deathrow Remix] – 5:48
"Head, Head, & More Head, Pt. 1" – 4:01
"Breakdown" – 3:53
"Welcome to Club Hell" – 4:25
"Whatever" – 5:18
"Dance" – 3:28
"I Wanna Rock" – 4:38
"Come On" – 4:02
"Where Them Ho's At" – 3:08
"The Hop" – 3:46
"Bounce/Rock to the Beat" – 4:01
"Work It Out" – 3:08
"Lipstick on My Dick" – 2:50

References

1996 greatest hits albums
Luther Campbell albums
Luke Records compilation albums